Laura Bynum (born February 28, 1968 in Springfield, Illinois) is an American author. Her first novel, Veracity, was published in January, 2010.

Biography

Bynum graduated magna cum laude from the University of Illinois-Springfield and Eastern Illinois University. She received an offer to publish Veracity at the same time she discovered that she had breast cancer. At the 2006 Maui Writers Conference, Bynum won the Rupert Hughes Literary Writing Award for Veracity (then unpublished).

References

External links

Living people
American science fiction writers
21st-century American novelists
1968 births
University of Illinois at Springfield alumni
Eastern Illinois University alumni
American women novelists
Women science fiction and fantasy writers
21st-century American women writers